In the area of modern algebra known as group theory, the Harada–Norton group HN is a sporadic simple group of order
   214365671119
 = 273030912000000
 ≈ 3.

History and properties

Its Schur multiplier is trivial and its outer automorphism group has order 2. 

HN has an involution whose centralizer is of the form 2.HS.2, where HS is the Higman-Sims group (which is how Harada found it). 

The prime 5 plays a special role in the group. For example, it centralizes an element of order 5 in the Monster group (which is how Norton found it), and as a result acts naturally on a vertex operator algebra over the field with 5 elements . This implies that it acts on a 133 dimensional algebra over F5 with a commutative but nonassociative product, analogous to the Griess algebra .

Generalized monstrous moonshine

Conway and Norton suggested in their 1979 paper that monstrous moonshine is not limited to the monster, but that similar phenomena may be found for other groups. Larissa Queen and others subsequently found that one can construct the expansions of many Hauptmoduln from simple combinations of dimensions of sporadic groups. 
To recall, the prime number 5 plays a special role in the group and for HN, the relevant McKay-Thompson series is  where one can set the constant term ,

and η(τ) is the Dedekind eta function.

Maximal subgroups
 found the 14 conjugacy classes of maximal subgroups of HN as follows:

 A12
 2.HS.2
 U3(8):3
 21+8.(A5 × A5).2
 (D10 × U3(5)).2
 51+4.21+4.5.4
 26.U4(2)
 (A6 × A6).D8
 23+2+6.(3 × L3(2))
 52+1+2.4.A5
 M12:2 (Two classes, fused by an outer automorphism)
 34:2.(A4 × A4).4
 31+4:4.A5

References

S. P. Norton, F and other simple groups, PhD Thesis, Cambridge 1975.

External links
 MathWorld: Harada–Norton Group
 Atlas of Finite Group Representations: Harada–Norton group

Sporadic groups